The 1904 United States presidential election in Connecticut took place on November 8, 1904, as part of the 1904 United States presidential election. Voters chose seven representatives, or electors to the Electoral College, who voted for president and vice president.

Connecticut overwhelmingly voted for the Republican nominee, President Theodore Roosevelt, over the Democratic nominee, former Chief Judge of New York Court of Appeals Alton B. Parker. Roosevelt won Connecticut by a margin of 19.97%.

Results

See also
 United States presidential elections in Connecticut

References

Connecticut
1904
1904 Connecticut elections